Siwu Tang Wan  is a brownish-black pill used in traditional Chinese medicine to "normalize menstruation and enrich blood". It is aromatic and tastes slightly sweet and bitter. It is used where there is "deficiency of blood, and  irregular menstruation". The name Siwu Tang Wan literally means Pill of Four Substances in Chinese.

Chinese classic herbal formula

See also
 Chinese classic herbal formula
 Bu Zhong Yi Qi Wan

References

Traditional Chinese medicine pills